Luger may refer to a participant in the sport of luge, or:

People 
 Arnold Luger, Italian luger
 Dan Luger (born 1975), English rugby union player
 Florian Luger (born 1994), Austrian model
 Georg Luger (1849–1923), Austrian firearm designer
 Karolin Luger, Austrian-American biochemist and biophysicist
 Lex Luger (born 1958), American professional wrestler and football player
 Lex Luger (record producer) (born 1991), American hip hop record producer 
 Peter Luger (1866–1941), German-American chef and restaurateur

Other uses 
 Luger (film), a 1982 Dutch film written and directed by Theo van Gogh
 Luger pistol, a semi-automatic handgun
 Operation Luger, a joint military operation between the Canadian Forces and Afghan National Army in July 2007

See also 
 Lugar (disambiguation)
 Lugger